The Government of the 11th Dáil or the 3rd Government of Ireland (1 July 1943 – 9 June 1944) was the government of Ireland formed after the 1943 general election held on 23 June. It was a single-party Fianna Fáil government led by Éamon de Valera as Taoiseach. Fianna Fáil had been in office since the 1932 general election.

The 3rd Government lasted for  days.

3rd Government of Ireland

Nomination of Taoiseach
The members of the 11th Dáil first met on 1 July 1943. In the debate on the nomination of Taoiseach, Fianna Fáil leader and outgoing Taoiseach Éamon de Valera and Fine Gael leader and former President of the Executive Council W. T. Cosgrave were both proposed. The nomination of de Valera was approved by 67 to 37. De Valera was then appointed as Taoiseach by President Douglas Hyde.

Members of the Government
After his appointment as Taoiseach by the president, Éamon de Valera proposed the members of the government and they were approved by the Dáil on 2 July 1943. They were then appointed by the president.

Parliamentary Secretaries
On 2 July, the Government appointed Parliamentary Secretaries on the nomination of the Taoiseach.

See also
Dáil Éireann
Constitution of Ireland
Politics of the Republic of Ireland

References

Governments of Ireland
1943 establishments in Ireland
1944 disestablishments in Ireland
Cabinets established in 1943
Cabinets disestablished in 1944
Minority governments
11th Dáil